Philippe Richert (born 22 May 1953) is a French politician of The Republicans party (known as the Union for a Popular Movement until 2015), president of the regional council of Grand Est from 2016 to 2017. He previously was the president of the regional council of Alsace, until its dissolution on 1 January 2016.

From 1992 to 2010, Richert was a member of the Senate of France, representing the Bas-Rhin department, and was nominated as the responsible for the relations between the French Senate and the Israeli Knesset. He was Minister for Local authorities under the Minister of Interior, Overseas, Local authorities and Immigration from 14 November 2010 to 10 May 2012. He began his political career as a member of the Bas-Rhin Departmental Council, representing the La Petite Pierre canton. Mr. Richert is also the president of the Lalique Museum in Wingen-sur-Moder.

Works

References
Page on the Senate website
Nouveau Dictionnaire de biographie alsacienne

1953 births
Living people
French Senators of the Fifth Republic
Presidents of the Regional Council of Grand Est
Regional councillors of Grand Est
People from Bas-Rhin
Politicians from Grand Est
Presidents of the Alsace Regional Council
Senators of Bas-Rhin
Union for a Popular Movement politicians
University of Strasbourg alumni
Recipients of the Order of Merit of Baden-Württemberg
French Protestants